Alessandro Patias (born 8 July 1985) is an Italian professional futsal player who plays as a pivot for Belgian side Halle-Gooik and the Italy national team.

Honours
Benfica
Liga Portuguesa: 2014–15
Taça de Portugal: 2014–15, 2016–17
Supertaça de Portugal: 2015, 2016

References

External links
 Benfica official profile 
 

1985 births
Living people
Sportspeople from Santa Catarina (state)
Futsal forwards
Brazilian men's futsal players
Italian men's futsal players
Brazilian emigrants to Italy
Marca Futsal players
S.L. Benfica futsal players
Italian expatriate sportspeople in Belgium
Italian expatriate sportspeople in Portugal